Jeremiah Martin (born June 19, 1996) is an American professional basketball player for Śląsk Wrocław of the PLK. He played college basketball for the Memphis Tigers.

Early life and high school career
Martin grew up in Memphis, Tennessee and Mitchell High School. He was a three year starter for the school's basketball team and Mitchell won the TSSAA Class A state season in his junior and senior seasons. As a senior, Martin was named Tennessee Mr. Basketball and the MVP of the TSSAA State Tournament after scoring 19 points in the state title game. Martin initially committed to play college basketball at Louisiana Tech, but de-committed in favor of playing at Memphis.

College career
Martin played four seasons for the Memphis Tigers. He appeared in 29 games as a freshman, starting five, and averaged 2.7 points and 1.2 assists per game. He became the team's starting point guard as a sophomore, averaging 10.3 points per game and leading the Tigers with 4.4 assists and 1.8 steals per game. As a junior, Martin averaged 18.9 points, 4.3 rebounds, 3.8 assists and an American Athletic Conference (AAC)-leading 2.3 steals per game and was named second team All-AAC, despite missing seven games due to a foot injury. In his senior season, Martin started all 36 of Memphis's games and was named first team All-AAC after averaging 19.7 points, 4.4 assists, 4.3 rebounds, and 2.19 steals per game. Martin led the team in points with 708 (the second most by a senior in Memphis history), as well as field goals (220), free throws made (202), assists (157), steals (79) and minutes played (1,236). He became the first player in school history with multiple 40-point games after scoring 41 points (all in the second half) against South Florida on February 2, 2019 and a career-high 43 against Tulane on February 20, 2019. He finished his collegiate career 10th in school history with 1,625 points scored and 436 assists. After his senior season Martin participated in the Portsmouth Invitational Tournament and was named to the All-Tournament team after averaging 15 points, 5.6 assists and 5.3 rebounds per game in three games.

Professional career

Sioux Falls Skyforce (2019–2020)
Martin worked out for several teams leading up to the 2019 NBA Draft, but ultimately went unselected. He was named to the Miami Heat's Summer League roster and averaged 7.7 points and 2.3 assists in seven games. Martin signed an Exhibit 10 contract with the Miami Heat on July 12, 2019. On October 15, 2019, Martin was waived by the Heat. Following training camp, Martin was added to the roster of the Heat's NBA G League affiliate, the Sioux Falls Skyforce. On November 30, he tallied 31 points, four rebounds, two assists and one steal in a win over the Northern Arizona Suns.

Brooklyn Nets (2020)
On January 15, 2020, Martin was signed by the Brooklyn Nets to a two-way contract. On January 22, Martin contributed 24 points, five rebounds, four assists, four steals and a block in a win over the South Bay Lakers. Martin made his NBA debut on January 31 against the Chicago Bulls, playing two minutes and grabbing a rebound in a 133–118 win. Martin scored his first career points on February 5, scoring two points on one for three shooting with one assist and one steal in the final nine minutes of a 129–88 win over the Golden State Warriors. On August 11, he scored a career high 24 points in a 108–96 win over the Orlando Magic. Martin was waived just prior to the start of the 2020–21 season.

Long Island Nets (2021)
On January 27, 2021, Martin re-signed with the Long Island Nets where he appeared in 15 games, all starts and averaged 18.5 points, 3.7 rebounds, 5.1 assists and 2.4 steals in 31.8 minutes.

Cleveland Cavaliers (2021)
On April 28, 2021, Martin signed a two-way contract with the Cleveland Cavaliers.

And the next off-season, Martin joined the New York Knicks and the Atlanta Hawks for the 2021 NBA summer league.

New Zealand Breakers (2021–2022)
On October 3, 2021, Martin signed with the New Zealand Breakers for the 2021–22 NBL season. On February 10, 2022, he parted ways with the Breakers. Martin averaged 12.3 points, 2.8 rebounds and 3.5 assists over ten games with the Breakers.

Śląsk Wrocław (2022–present)
On August 13, 2022, he has signed with Śląsk Wrocław of the PLK.

Career statistics

NBA

Regular season

|-
| style="text-align:left;"| 
| style="text-align:left;"| Brooklyn
| 9 || 0 || 11.0 || .453 || .278 || .786 || 1.1 || 2.0 || .8 || .2 || 7.1
|-
| style="text-align:left;"| 
| style="text-align:left;"| Cleveland
| 9 || 0 || 8.3 || .273 || .250 || .200 || .8 || .4 || .6 || .2 || 2.4
|- class="sortbottom"
| style="text-align:center;" colspan="2"| Career
| 18 || 0 || 9.7 || .384 || .267 || .632 || .9 || 1.2 || .7 || .2 || 4.8

Playoffs

|-
| style="text-align:left;"| 2020
| style="text-align:left;"| Brooklyn
| 3 || 0 || 9.0 || .286 || .600 || 1.000|| 1.0 || 1.3 || .0 || .3 || 4.0
|- class="sortbottom"
| style="text-align:center;" colspan="2"| Career
| 3 || 0 || 9.0 || .286 || .600 || 1.000|| 1.0 || 1.3 || .0 || .3 || 4.0

College

|-
| style="text-align:left;"| 2015–16
| style="text-align:left;"| Memphis
| 29 || 5 || 13.8 || .333 || .300 || .636 || 1.1 || 1.2 || .8 || .2 || 2.7
|-
| style="text-align:left;"| 2016–17
| style="text-align:left;"| Memphis
| 32 || 32 || 34.8 || .451 || .282 || .673 || 3.1 || 4.4 || 1.8 || .7 || 10.3
|-
| style="text-align:left;"| 2017–18
| style="text-align:left;"| Memphis
| 27 || 26 || 34.7 || .444 || .327 || .784 || 4.3 || 3.8 || 2.3 || .6|| 18.9
|-
| style="text-align:left;"| 2018–19
| style="text-align:left;"| Memphis
| 36 || 36 || 34.2 || .451 || .346 || .762 || 4.3 || 4.4 || 2.2 || .6 || 19.7
|- class="sortbottom"
| style="text-align:center;" colspan="2"| Career
| 124 || 134 || 29.7 || .441 || .325 || .745 || 3.2 || 3.5 || 1.8 || .6 || 13.1

References

External links
 Memphis Tigers bio
 NBA G League profile
 RealGM profile

1996 births
Living people
American expatriate basketball people in Germany
American expatriate basketball people in New Zealand
American men's basketball players
Basketball players from Memphis, Tennessee
BG Göttingen players
Brooklyn Nets players
Cleveland Cavaliers players
Long Island Nets players
Memphis Tigers men's basketball players
New Zealand Breakers players
Point guards
Sioux Falls Skyforce players
Śląsk Wrocław basketball players
Undrafted National Basketball Association players